Breitenstein is a 1,622 m high mountain of the Bavarian Prealps.

Normal routes 
The most common route is from Fischbachau to the Kesselalm continuing via the Hubertushütte to the summit.

Mountains of Bavaria
Mountains of the Alps